The 2014 Real Salt Lake season was the team's tenth year of existence and also the first year with new head coach Jeff Cassar. The team's first game was on March 8 at StubHub Center.

Background

In 2013 Real Salt Lake played in the MLS Cup final, losing in the tenth round of penalty kicks to Sporting Kansas City. Real Salt Lake also announced that LifeVantage would be a long term sponsor beginning in the 2014 Season. Additionally, long term head coach, Jason Kreis announced that he would leave the club at the end of the season to embark on an opportunity to become the first coach for New York City FC to start in the 2015 season. Other changes to the staff including Miles Joseph who left to assist Kreis in New York and C. J. Brown returned to his former club, Chicago Fire Soccer Club, to serve as assistant coach. Jeff Cassar was promoted to be the head coach beginning in the 2014 season.

Overview

March
Real Salt Lake began the season away to LA Galaxy on 8 April 2014 and won their first match of the season. Nick Rimando was awarded the first week Player of the Week after a nine-save performance helping to secure the win. Additionally, Rimando was voted for MLS Save of the Week and named for MLS Team of the Week along with defender Nat Borchers for week one. Real Salt Lake continued to remain unbeaten throughout the month with draws at San Jose (3–3) and the home opener to LA Galaxy (1–1), and a three-nil home win to Toronto FC which saw Álvaro Saborío, Javier Morales, and Nat Borchers named to the MLS team of the Week for week four. Captain Kyle Beckerman was also awarded MLS Goal of the Week for his 25-yard shot against San Jose that earned him nearly 50 percent of the votes.

April
RSL continued their unbeaten run through the month with draws away to Sporting Kansas City (0–0) and Philadelphia Union (2–2), and home against Vancouver Whitecaps FC (2–2). Real Salt Lake also had a single home win over Portland Timbers (1–0), to bring the tally to eleven consecutive matches unbeaten against the Timbers. Real Salt Lake also were honored by being awarded the "Team of the Year" in the Utah Governor's State of Sport awards, as well as awards to Kyle Beckerman for "Male Professional Athlete of the Year", and Nick Rimando was awarded for "Highlight of the Year" for their accomplishments in the 2013 season.

Luis Gil was called up to the U-21 US National Team for the pre-Olympic Training Camp, but backed out to recover from a lingering hamstring injury. Defender Carlos Salcedo additionally was called up to train with the Mexico U-21 National Team to prepare for the 2016 Summer Olympics. RSL Arizona Academy graduate Justen Glad was offered a Homegrown Player contract and became the seventh academy graduate to join the first team. Real also announced a new Under-12 Academy to be based in Utah with graduates being promoted to the RSL Arizona Academy.

May
Real Salt Lake continued their unbeaten run to tie the MLS record for an unbeaten start of the season, tying with 1996 and 2010 LA Galaxy and 2000 Kansas City Wizards. RSL suffered their first defeat the final day of the month when they lost away to Seattle Sounders. Forward Álvaro Saborío was named to the Costa Rica World Cup Roster, and Midfielder Kyle Beckerman and Goalkeeper Nick Rimando were called up to the United States men's national soccer team and departed to train with their respective teams in preparation for the upcoming 2014 FIFA World Cup, although Saborío returned after fracturing his fifth metatarsal in training. Jordan Allen was ruled out for the remainder of the season after undergoing a microfracture surgery to his right knee.

Joao Plata won the MLS Player of the Week for week nine after his two-goal performance against Chicago Fire Soccer Club. Javier Morales scored the second fasted goal in RSL history with his first goal finding the net fifteen seconds into the match. Javi also got his first hat-trick for Real Salt Lake in the team's first ever win away to FC Dallas. In Nick Rimando's absence, Jeff Attinella won the MLS Save of the Week for Week 11 with a double save in the win against Colorado Rapids.

Competitions

Preseason

Matches

Desert Diamond Cup

Standings

Matches

MLS regular season

Standings

Western Conference

Overall table 
Note: the table below has no impact on playoff qualification and is used solely for determining host of the MLS Cup, certain CCL spots, and 2015 MLS draft. The conference tables are the sole determinant for teams qualifying to the playoffs

Results summary

Results by round

Match results 

Legend:: 

Schedule Updated: February 2, 2014
Source: Real Salt Lake Schedule

MLS Cup Playoffs

Western Conference Semifinal

U.S. Open Cup

Kickoff times are in MDT

Friendlies

Club

Roster
As of April 8, 2014. Age calculated as of the start of the 2014 season.

Transfers

In

Out

Loans

In

Out

Note: Kwame Watson-Siriboe and Benji Lopez have both played matches with RSL Reserves while on loan away from Real Salt Lake

Coaching and technical staff

Kits

Statistics

Appearances and goals

Source: Real Salt Lake Statistics

Individual awards
The MLS Player of the Week, Month, and Year is awarded by the North American Soccer Reporters (NASR) and decided by vote.

Weekly awards

Top scorers

Top Assists

Source: mlssoccer.com

Disciplinary record

Source: CompetitionsCompetitive matches only * indicates a second yellow card

Captains

References

Real Salt Lake
Real Salt Lake seasons
Real Salt Lake